William Burton (October 16, 1789 – August 5, 1866) was an American physician and politician from Milford, in Kent County, Delaware. He was a member of the Democratic Party, who served as Governor of Delaware.

Early life and family 
Burton was probably born in Indian River Hundred, Sussex County, Delaware. He first married Eliza Sorden. After Eliza's death in 1829, he married Ann C. Hill and had one child, Rhoda. They lived in the Parson Thorne Mansion at 501 NW Front Street in Milford, and were members of Christ Episcopal Church.  He also lived at the "Towers," now a contributing property in the North Milford Historic District.

Professional and political career
After receiving his medical degree from the University of Pennsylvania's Medical School, Burton had a practice in Lewes, Delaware for a time, and then permanently in Milford. He was Brigadier-General of the Sussex County militia in 1827, and was elected as a Whig to the office of Sheriff of Kent County, and served from 1830 until 1834. With the disintegration of the Whig Party over the issue of slavery, Burton moved to the more "states rights" Democratic Party in 1848. He was his party's candidate for governor in 1854, but lost to his neighbor, Peter F. Causey, a former Democrat who had left the increasingly conservative party for the seemingly more progressive American Party.

Governor of Delaware
Delaware experienced all the contention and bitterness of a border state in the Civil War and the events leading up to it, but because of its location and certain decisive military action, was spared much of the bloodshed of Kentucky and Missouri. Nevertheless, the divisions in communities and families, and their corresponding strong feelings were the same. A slave state with very few slaves or slaveholders, many in Delaware had an attitude they called "states rights," which really meant, "Outsiders are not going to tell us what to do." Given the close economic ties to Philadelphia, and the geographical separation from the Confederacy, there was little sentiment for actual secession. However, the opposition to the abolitionist and voting rights agenda of the Republican federal government were strong enough to create considerable contentiousness. These feelings were strongest in the two lower counties, which still had a majority of the population in 1860, and completely dominated the General Assembly, the real decision maker in the state.

With the approach of the Civil War, the American Party had collapsed over the issue of temperance, and the progressive elements of that party joined with other old line Whigs in a Delaware People's Party. Most of this group would eventually join with the new Republican Party in Delaware. Burton ran for governor a second time, in 1858, against the candidate of this party, James S. Buckmaster, a Frederica merchant, and narrowly won. He then served from January 18, 1859, until January 20, 1863.

Burton tried to steer a course down the middle of all the competing interests. Like a majority in the state, he was strongly sympathetic towards the South, and a strong opponent of abolition, but he opposed Delaware's possible secession. A delegation led by Mississippi Judge Henry Dickinson came from the Confederacy to attempt to persuade the General Assembly to enact secession, but the suggestion was rejected, and Delaware remained firmly in the Union. Meanwhile, factions of armed supporters of both sides gathered arms and trained. Burton asked the groups favoring the South to disarm, but later withdrew the request. At the same time he appointed adjutant general and DuPont company president, Henry du Pont, to lead the state militia. du Pont was more decisive, and saw that when additional arms were secured from the federal government, they were directed toward loyal militia, and that the all-important powder mills of his company were properly protected. Du Pont would end up supplying over half the gunpowder used by the Union armies. When the call came for soldiers for the federal army, Burton again compromised by refusing to turn over the Delaware militia, or to pay for bounties, but did encourage enlistment. In fact, support for the Union was so strong that Delaware had a larger number of soldiers per size of population than any other state. This fact prompted U.S. President Abraham Lincoln to remark that "South of the Mason-Dixon line, noble little Delaware led off right from the first." 

It took du Pont's well armed loyal militia, and other federal troops, to disarm the irregular units formed in Sussex and Kent County, and the militia went on to occupy the old State House and otherwise secure the state. Then as Burton's term came to its end, federal troops, once again, were called in by Republican leaders to supervise the 1862 elections, opening up possibilities for Republican electoral victories, but assuring a generation of bitterness on the part of many Delawareans towards the party that seemed to be unjustifiably ruling at the point of a bayonet.

Death and legacy
Burton died in Milford and is buried there at the Christ Episcopal Churchyard.

Almanac
Elections are held on the first Tuesday after November 1. The governor takes office the third Tuesday in January, and has a four-year term.

References

Images
Delaware’s Governors

External links
Biographical Directory of the Governors of the United States
Delaware’s Governors

The Political Graveyard

Places with more information
Delaware Historical Society; website; 505 North Market Street, Wilmington, Delaware 19801; (302) 655-7161
University of Delaware; Library website; 181 South College Avenue, Newark, Delaware 19717; (302) 831-2965

1789 births
1866 deaths
People from Milford, Delaware
Physicians from Delaware
Democratic Party governors of Delaware
Burials in Kent County, Delaware
Union (American Civil War) state governors
19th-century American politicians
Christians from Delaware
Delaware sheriffs
19th-century American Episcopalians